Coley may refer to:

Places
Coley, a place in the Saint Thomas Parish, Jamaica
Coley, Berkshire, an inner-town district in Berkshire, England
Coley Park, a suburb of Reading, Berkshire, England
Coley's Point, a settlement in Newfoundland and Labrador
Coley, Staffordshire, a hamlet
Coley, West Yorkshire, a village in Halifax Rural District
Coley, Somerset, a hamlet

People
Coley (surname)

First name
Coley Jones, American country blues mandolin player
Coley McCabe, American country music singer
Coley McDonough, American football player
Coley O'Brien, Irish footballer
Coley O'Toole, keyboard and rhythm guitar player for the We Are Kings American rock band
Coley Wallace, American actor and heavyweight boxer

Other uses
Coley (fish), a species of fish,  Pollachius virens